Laura Cortese is an American singer, songwriter, and fiddler. She was born in San Francisco and attended Berklee College of Music in Boston. She currently resides in Belgium.

Cortese regularly performs solo, but usually with her band Laura Cortese and the Dance Cards, with whom she released two albums, the first of which was California Calling which debuted in 2017. She has also performed with Tao Rodríguez-Seeger in the Anarchist Orchestra, and with Hanneke Cassel and Lissa Schneckenburger in Halali. In the past she has played with acts including Uncle Earl, Band of Horses and Pete Seeger. She is also a co-founder of the Boston Celtic Music Festival.

Laura Cortese And The Dance Cards
 Bitter Better (2020)
 California Calling (2017)

Solo Albums And Various Collaborations
 All in Always (2016)
 Into the Dark (2013)
 Acoustic Project (2010)
 Bad Year: Single (2008)
 Blow the Candle Out (2007)
 Even the Lost Creek (2006)
 Hush (2004)

References

External links
Official Laura Cortese website

American fiddlers
Berklee College of Music alumni
Living people
Singers from San Francisco
Year of birth missing (living people)
Place of birth missing (living people)
Songwriters from San Francisco
21st-century violinists